Haining West railway station is a railway station on the Shanghai–Hangzhou high-speed railway located in Haining, Jiaxing, Zhejiang, China. It opened on 26 October 2010.

References 

Railway stations in Zhejiang
Railway stations in China opened in 2010